Baubigny is the name of several communes in France:

Baubigny, Côte-d'Or, in the Côte-d'Or département 
Baubigny, Manche, in the Manche département